The TATA Kestrel, also known as the IPMV  (Infantry Protected Mobility Vehicle), is an armoured personnel carrier family developed by Tata Advance Systems Limited and the Defence Research and Development Organisation (DRDO). It was developed to replace age-old Soviet-era BMPs and APCs in service with the Indian Army.

History
The Indian Army currently has large fleet of BMP-1s, BMP-2s, and various types of APCs of Soviet origin. Over time, these vehicles have become obsolete and incapable of taking on the challenge of modern-day warfare. At the same time many superior designs have evolved in Western nations.So,Tata Motors and DRDO developed this vehicle in partnership with Supacat to meet army requirements.

The vehicle was first shown at the Defexpo 2014 convention, showing a Kongsberg PROTECTOR MCT-30R turret and a M151 Remote Weapon station equipped with Javelins.

In October 2019, the Indian Defence ministry cleared it for production and export to friendly nations. 200 Kestrels are planned by Indian Army

Operational history
As tensions continue to escalate between India and China over the de facto Line of Actual Control, DRDO-TATA Kestrel (WhAP) which was till recently in photos only, landed at Ladakh undergoing cold-weather trials. The first batch of WhAP's were inducted into the army on 12 April 2022.

WhAP is also being delivered to Central Reserve Police Force.

Design

Development of WhAP 8 x 8 Amphibious Wheeled Armoured Vehicle was taken up to provide common platform for various vehicle type like Wheeled APC, 30 mm Infantry Combat Vehicle, 105 mm Light Tank, command post vehicle, ambulance, special purpose platform, 120 mm mortar carrier, CBRN Vehicle based on the same chassis of Kestrel.

Kestrel is designed for modern day warfare keeping in mind the crew survivability, protection against small arms fire, mobility and protection against concealed explosives. The armour is made up of applique and composites along with welded steels. Additional armour kit can be applied in heavy firing zones. The hull floor is further strengthened to defeat mines and similar explosives. The seats are attached to the roof for improved blast protection. Fuel tanks are placed outside the troop compartment for additional safety.

The 8X8 wheel configuration is set on a hydropneumatic suspension utilizing double wishbone arrangement. All wheels have run flat capability to allow the vehicle to move even after suffering punctures.  There are four axles, the front axle is steerable which minimizes the turning radius of the vehicle.

The glacis plate is very shallow, and the fuel tank is mounted outside the vehicle to improve survivability.  A standard operating crew of two including driver and commander, with a full mechanized squad of 12 members. Anti-blast seats are installed to absorb any shocks and secondary slams, reducing brain and spinal injuries.

Engine is placed at front left. Passengers are placed in the centerline in a back-to-back fashion, each facing a firing port.The Kestrel has high power-to-weight ratio for mountainous terrain and is powered by a 600hp turbocharged diesel engine. The vehicle is fully amphibious, propelled by two waterjets. It can reach up to 100 km/hr.

The vehicle has been designed to provide protection against land mines. It ranges from Stanag 4569 Level I to Level IV with the hull being designed with protection up to Stanag Level III. The hull configuration evolved follows a 'V’-type bottom with double configuration consisting of an inner panel and bottom panel. The bottom panel is designed to deflect the blast energy and get deformed to minimize the blast effects.

Snap-on modules are used in the Kestrel in order to easily configure it according to needed roles in the field.

Weapons
The standard turret installation can accommodate a roof-mounted remote controlled Kongsberg Protector MCT-30R(RWS), which is outfitted with a 30mm autocannon. It has an effective range of 3,000m. The turret also has a 7.62mm coaxial machine gun.

The RCWS adds a heavy 12.7mm machine gun or a 40mm automatic grenade launcher. It also has option for adding up to two anti-tank guided missile launcher in quick fire mode. So, the vehicle is capable of countering enemy infantry, light armoured vehicles even main battle tanks.

In the 2016 Defexpo convention, a Kestrel was seen outfitted with the BMP-2 turret. Its known as the WhAP (Wheeled Amphibious Platform).

Variant
Planned variants include ambulance, NBC recon, Command Post and engineer vehicle.

Operators
 : Inducted into the Indian Army on 12 April 2022.

References

External links
 

Armoured personnel carriers of India
Tata vehicles
Eight-wheeled vehicles
Military vehicles introduced in the 2010s
Amphibious armoured personnel carriers
Wheeled armoured personnel carriers
Armoured personnel carriers of the post–Cold War period
Wheeled amphibious armoured fighting vehicles